City Hall Station or City Hall station may refer to:

Asia

South Korea
 City Hall station (Busan Metro), a metro station in Busan
 City Hall station (Daejeon Metro), a metro station in Daejeon
 City Hall station (Seoul), a subway station in Seoul
 City Hall–Yongin University station, a people-mover station in Yongin
 Bucheon City Hall station, a subway station in Bucheon, Gyeonggi
 Gimhae City Hall station, a light metro station in Buwon-dong, Gimhae
 Incheon City Hall station, a subway station in Incheon
 Suwon City Hall station, a subway station in Suwon, Gyeonggi
 Uijeongbu City Hall station, a light metro station in Uijeongbu

Singapore
 City Hall MRT station, a mass rapid transit station in the Downtown Core district of Singapore

Taiwan
 Taichung City Hall metro station, a mass transit station in Taichung, Taiwan
 Taipei City Hall Bus Station, a multi-use transportation complex in Taipei, Taiwan
 Taipei City Hall metro station, a mass rapid transit station in Taipei, Taiwan

North America

Canada
 City Hall station (Calgary), a light rail transit station in Calgary, Alberta
 Broadway–City Hall station, an underground rapid transit station in Vancouver, British Columbia
 Kitchener City Hall station, a light rail transit station in Kitchener, Ontario

United States
 City Hall station (PATCO), a commuter rail station in Camden, New Jersey
 City Hall station (SEPTA), a subway station in Philadelphia, Pennsylvania
 City Hall station (Rochester), a former subway station in Rochester, New York
 Gresham City Hall station, a light rail transit station in Gresham, Oregon
 Old City Hall station, a future light rail station in Tacoma, Washington

New York City Subway
 Brooklyn Bridge–City Hall station (IRT Lexington Avenue Line) at Park Row in Manhattan; serving the 
 City Hall station (IRT Lexington Avenue Line), the loop station closed 1945; underneath the public area in front of City Hall in Manhattan
 City Hall station (BMT Broadway Line) at Murray Street and Broadway in Manhattan; serving the 
 City Hall station (IRT Second Avenue Line), a former elevated station in Manhattan

See also
 City Hall (disambiguation)
 Hall Station (disambiguation)